is a two-car limited express train operated by Kyushu Railway Company (JR Kyushu) in Japan.

Overview
On November 9, 2016, JR Kyushu released a press release detailing its new themed limited express, Kawasemi Yamasemi, scheduled to debut in spring 2017. On December 16, 2016, it was revealed that the new train would begin operation on March 4, 2017. It is currently in normal operation.

The Kawasemi Yamasemi is named for the Kingfisher and Crested Kingfisher, and follows the Kuma River along its route. It features the birds extensively as its motif.

Design
The train was designed by Eiji Mitooka and Don Design and Associates, and used local resources (such as Japanese cypress and cedar) extensively in its construction. Onboard sales will also consist of local products.

The President of JR Kyushu, Toshihiko Aoyagi, at the train's unveiling, was quoted as saying that he hoped the train would run as a symbol of recovery (from the 2016 Kumamoto earthquakes).

Operations
The train will run three daily round trips between Kumamoto and Hitoyoshi, running along the Hisatsu Line and Kagoshima Main Line.

Train cars
The two cars are named Kawasemi and Yamasemi, respectively. They are both converted from KiHa 47 diesel multiple units. Kawasemi (blue) was converted from KiHa 47 8087. Yamasemi (green) was converted from KiHa 47 9051.

See also
 List of named passenger trains of Japan
 Joyful Train, the generic name for excursion and charter trains in Japan

References

External links 

 

Kyushu Railway Company
Named passenger trains of Japan
Railway services introduced in 2017
2017 establishments in Japan